Eidsvoll Ullensaker Blad is a local newspaper published in Eidsvoll, Norway.

It was established in 1901 as Eidsvoll Blad, and eventually became affiliated with the Centre Party. It was originally published twice a week; this was increased to three issues in 1930 and four issues in 1969.

It mainly covers the municipalities of Eidsvoll and Hurdal, but is also distributed in Gjerdrum, Ullensaker and Nannestad. It had a circulation of 6,858 in 1983, increasing to the current 8,178, of whom 7,915 are subscribers. It is owned by various local people and groups.

References

External links
 Official website

1901 establishments in Norway
Centre Party (Norway) newspapers
Mass media in Eidsvoll
Newspapers published in Norway
Norwegian-language newspapers
Publications established in 1901